Pineapple coral may refer to two different species of corals:

 Blastomussa merleti, found in the Indo-Pacific Ocean area
 Dichocoenia stokesii, found in the Caribbean Sea and the western Atlantic Ocean